Destiny 2: Lightfall is a major expansion for Destiny 2, a first-person shooter video game by Bungie. Representing the seventh expansion and the sixth year of extended content for Destiny 2, it was released on February 28, 2023, after being pushed back from its original fall 2022 release as a result of the delay of the previous expansion, The Witch Queen. Lightfall revolves around the exiled Cabal emperor Calus, a recurring character throughout Destiny 2, now a Disciple of the Witness, as he, the Witness, and their army of Shadow Legion Cabal and Tormentors attack the secret, technologically advanced human city of Neomuna on Neptune enroute to the Last City to herald a second Collapse. The expansion added new content across the game, including new missions, Player versus Environment locations, a Player versus Player map, player gear, weaponry, and a new raid. Two new dungeons as well as a returning reprised raid from either the original Destiny or one previously removed from Destiny 2 will be released over the course of the year. There are also four seasonal content offerings to be released throughout Year 6 of the game: Season of Defiance, which is available alongside the expansion, Season of the Deep in May 2023, followed by two unnamed seasons to be released later in the year.

Gameplay

Lightfall expands on the base Destiny 2 gameplay by adding a new free roam world for the city Neomuna on the planet Neptune. Over the course of the year of content for Lightfall will include one new raid, "Root of Nightmares", released on March 10, 2023, two new dungeons, and one returning raid from either the original Destiny (2014) or Destiny 2 that had previously been removed from the game. New and existing story content was expanded with a "Legendary" difficulty similar to that from The Witch Queen (2022), designed to be challenging for single players but with improved rewards for completing. Starting with Lightfall and future expansions, previous expansions and their content will no longer be removed from the game and placed in the Destiny Content Vault (DCV), while seasonal content will still continue to be removed and vaulted at the start of each expansion. While the other seasonal activities from The Witch Queen were removed with Lightfall, the PsiOps and Heist Battlegrounds activities from Season of the Risen (Season 16) and Season of the Seraph (Season 19), respectively, were added to the Vanguard Ops playlist, and, alongside the Battlegrounds from Season of the Chosen (Season 13), were also made available as Nightfalls and Grandmaster Nightfalls.

Emperor Calus's Shadow Legion, Cabal warriors that carry the power of the Darkness, and Tormentors, the personal soldiers of the Witness, are new major enemies within Lightfall. Cabal Shadow Legion enemies use Pyramid technology to shield themselves in battle. Described by Bungie as the "most scary unit [players] have ever fought", Tormentors use giant scythes in battle and can suppress Guardian ability and super usage and even instantly kill Guardians by grabbing them at close range.

Beyond Light (2020) introduced the game's first Darkness subclass, Stasis, which used items called Aspects and Fragments to give the player more customization of how Stasis could be used; during The Witch Queen, the original Light powers of Void, Solar, and Arc were revamped to be given the same Aspect and Fragment system as Stasis. Lightfall added a brand new, second Darkness subclass called Strand, which also features this modularity. Strand's powers are based on entanglement and unweaving via manipulation of reality through an extra-dimensional matrix called the Weave. One such power is a grappling hook-like ability that allows Guardians to grapple onto environmental features or other characters, enabling new forms of movement. Each of the main character classes gain a new subclass based on Strand: Berserkers for Titans, who can use twin Strand blades to quickly slice through enemies through their "Bladefury" super; Broodweavers for Warlocks, who can unleash Strand missiles which explode into creatures called Threadlings upon impact through their "Needlestorm" super; and Threadrunners for Hunters, who can summon a Strand rope dart to lash enemies with through their "Silkstrike" super.

Across the board, Lightfall introduced adjustments to game difficulty levels for endgame content (Nightfalls and raids, for example) and based on Bungie's monitoring of activities to date. Rather than setting and capping these activities at a given level, higher-difficulty activities are only be available to players above certain power levels. Further, Guardians' Power level is given a penalty based on the difficulty level, making them more vulnerable and less damaging to enemies. Accompanying these changes include an improved system of rewards to make the challenging content more worthwhile to complete. Elemental burns, which were originally fixed based on the activity, are now split into season-long and weekly rotating surges (increases for Guardians' damage) and threats (increases for enemy damage). Special overcharged weapons grant additional damage during periods where its element is surging.

Among gameplay improvements, Lightfall adds an in-game loadout feature, which previously were performed through third-party applications that interfaced with Destiny 2. This allows players to set pre-determined armor and weapon sets, including all mods and appearance modifiers, making it easy to switch between various loadouts for various activities. Lightfall will also introduce an improved in-game "looking for group" (LFG) feature before the release of the next expansion, The Final Shape (2024), which will allow players to easily find other players to engage with content that is designed for matchmaking. A commendation system was also introduced to allow players to provide positive recognition and accolades to other players after an activity has been completed. These new features are layered atop a new Guardian level system which is designed to reflect how much expertise the player has with Destiny 2, and also serves as a new player onboarding system, with some features locked out until the player has reached a specific Guardian level.

Other significant gameplay changes include:
 The seasonal artifact, which provides bonus power levels across all characters on a player's account for a season as introduced in Shadowkeep, continues to be used in Lightfall. However, mods on the seasonal artifact have been replaced with unique, unlockable perks which only 12 can be active per character, and these perks are applied passively when active; moreover, resetting the artifact to change perks will be free.
 In addition to the in-game loadout feature, a mod customization feature was added, which allows players to view and modify all weapon and armor mods and character stats on a single screen. Furthermore, armor and armor mods no longer have elemental affinities, with some armor mods now providing benefits to weapons based on their damage type, and the general energy cost of mods has been reduced to encourage more experimentation in buildcrafting. As well, the Charged With Light combat style mods was replaced with an Armor Charge system, while Elemental Wells was replaced with those of damage-type-specific spawned objects, such as Stasis shards and Arc ionic traces.
 The Match Game modifier was removed from high-difficulty endgame activities such as Grandmaster Nightfalls and Master-level raids, with base elemental shield resistance to non-matching elemental damage to be adjusted as a result. As well, in addition to anti-Champion weapon perks that can be unlocked on the seasonal artifact, each subclass' elemental status effects can now be used to stun Champions (Void volatile, Solar radiant, and Strand unravel stuns Barrier Champions; Arc jolt, Void suppression, and Stasis slow stuns Overload Champions; and Arc blind, Stasis shatter, Solar ignition, and Strand suspend stuns Unstoppable Champions). 
 Ada-1, who serves as the vendor for armor transmogrification for players since Season 14, now sells shaders offered from the first three years of Destiny 2 starting in Season 20, with three shaders featured for purchase every week. As well, legacy weapons and gear focusing was introduced for strikes and Nightfalls, Crucible, Gambit, Trials of Osiris, and Iron Banner, with each vendor (Commander Zavala, Lord Shaxx, the Drifter, Saint-14, and Lord Saladin, respectively) providing a selection of weapons and gear that were released in previous seasons and expansions. Umbral engrams, which were reintroduced in Season 13 and were used to focus seasonal weapons and gear at the H.E.L.M., as well as seasonal Umbral energies, werr removed in Season 20 in favor of the weapon and gear focusing system used by the ritual vendors in the Tower.
 Weapon crafting, which was introduced in The Witch Queen, was further simplified with Lightfall. Deepsight Resonance on weapons that cannot be crafted and Resonant Element crafting materials (which are obtained from either completing attunement progress on Deepsight Resonance weapons or dismantling them) was completely removed from the game at the launch of Lightfall and Season 20, with standard currencies such as Glimmer and Enhancement Cores instead used to craft weapons, with fewer weapons that can be crafted. Resonant, Harmonic, and Ascendant Alloys continue to be used for weapon crafting but Bungie plans to eventually remove Resonant and Harmonic Alloys sometime during Year 6. Furthermore, starting in Season 21, perks on Adept raid weapons can be upgraded into enhanced perks similar to those on crafted weapons; non-crafted weapons will have the ability to have enhanced perks sometime later in the year.
 With the addition of the PsiOps and Heist Battlegrounds activities to the Vanguard Ops playlist and Battlegrounds in general becoming available as Nightfalls and Grandmaster Nightfalls, the "Lake of Shadows" and "The Arms Dealer" strikes from the first year of Destiny 2 were reworked, while the "Exodus Crash" and "The Inverted Spire" strikes were removed from the Vanguard Ops, Nightfall, and Grandmaster Nightfall rotation in preparation for a rework of those strikes.
 An exotic mission rotator will be added in Season 22, which will feature the "Presage", "Vox Obscura", and "Operation: Seraph's Shield" exotic missions from Seasons 13, 16, and 19, respectively. Due to this, the exotic weapons, Dead Messenger and Revision Zero, from the latter two were not added to the exotic archive; Dead Man's Tale from Presage remains purchasable from Xur on the weekends.

Seasonal changes 
In addition to the major story and content added with Lightfall, Bungie divides the year into four seasons. Each season offers a free-tier and paid-tier season pass to acquire new gear, game currency, and cosmetics, as well as new activities and triumphs associated with those activities, some of which requires purchase of the season pass to access. Like the previous two years (Years 4 and 5), seasonal activities and story missions can still be accessed in subsequent seasons for the duration of Year 6 (some triumphs, however, can only be completed during the active season).

Season of Defiance (Season 20) began with the launch of Lightfall on February 28, 2023. New and existing players' Power levels were increased to the new minimum Power level of 1600, a soft cap of 1750, with the hard Power level cap set to 1800, and the pinnacle reward cap at 1810; these power levels will remain the same throughout Year 6. The season's story runs concurrent with the Lightfall story, where the Guardian teams up with Mara Sov, Devrim Kay, Mithrax, Amanda Holliday, and Crow to help rescue civilians who have been taken hostage and imprisoned by the Cabal Shadow Legion. The season adds the "Defiant Battlegrounds" activity, in which the player infiltrates Pyramid strongholds within Earth's European Dead Zone and Cosmodrome and the Ascendant Realm to rescue civilians from the Shadow Legion and Taken. Completing the activity rewards seasonal weapons and gear with the help of a revamped War Table in the H.E.L.M. The season also introduces an exotic quest called "//node.ovrd.AVALON//" which rewards a new exotic glaive, the Vexcalibur. The seasonal artifact featured during this season is the Ascendant Scepter (with perks focusing on mid- to long-range weapons and Void, Solar and Strand abilities).

Season of the Deep (Season 21) will begin on May 22, 2023.

Plot

Lightfall is based on the discovery of the cyberpunk-like city Neomuna on Neptune. Neomuna has survived the Collapse and the arrival of the Black Fleet in the Solar System. The city is populated by humans that had been previously cut off from the rest of the system; these humans, known as the Neomuni, lack the Light granted by the Traveler but instead have trained Cloud Striders—voluntary human soldiers who have undergone cybernetic augmentation at the cost of significantly reducing their lifespan—that help to defend the city.

During the events of The Witch Queen a year ago, the Guardian had defeated the Hive god Savathûn, the Witch Queen, who threatened them with the return of the Witness, the being that wields the Darkness and is leading the Black Fleet's attack on the Solar System. During Season of the Haunted, the exiled emperor of the Cabal, Calus, became a Disciple of the Witness and the herald of the second Collapse after communing with the Lunar Pyramid. During Season of the Seraph, the Warmind Rasputin sacrificed himself to prevent Eramis, Kell of Darkness, from using the Warsats to destroy the Traveler as it began to leave the Last City, with the Traveler remaining in Earth's orbit. A posthumous message from Rasputin revealed the existence of Neomuna, home to an extremely powerful artifact connected to the Traveler called the Veil.

Lightfall begins shortly after the events of Season of the Seraph. The Vanguard faces heavy resistance against the Black Fleet as they arrive in Earth's orbit to attack the Traveler. The Witness emerges from its Pyramid and effortlessly destroys most of the Vanguard forces as the Traveler attacks the Black Fleet with a beam of Light, only for it to be suppressed by Pyramids that begin to surround it. The Witness then attempts to commune with the Traveler, who grants it a vision of the Veil on Neomuna, and orders Emperor Calus and his loyal Cabal forces, called the Shadow Legion, and the Witness's personal soldiers, the Tormentors, to travel to Neptune to retrieve the Veil. Osiris then decides to go after Calus and the Shadow Legion, fearing that the Witness has located the Veil on Neptune. The Guardian is sent to watch after him, as the loss of his Ghost Sagira (who sacrificed herself before the events of Season of the Hunt) makes him vulnerable to a final death.

Osiris and the Guardian arrive in Neomuna where they are greeted by the senior Cloud Strider, Rohan, and his apprentice Nimbus, who gives the Guardian an Awoken artifact, the Ascendant Scepter, on behalf of the Awoken Queen Mara Sov to aid them in the battles to come. Calus' Black Fleet flagship, the Typhon Imperator, has already arrived and laid siege to Neomuna, and the Neomuni have gone into cryonic stasis and their consciousness uploaded into the CloudArk, Neomuna's cloud computer and city infrastructure network. As they venture through the city fighting the Shadow Legion, the Guardian discovers threads of Darkness energy throughout the city, which Osiris dubs "Strand", which they are able to use to great effect against Calus' loyalists but at considerable cost to themselves. Suddenly possessing the Guardian's Ghost, the Witness commands Calus to set up the Radial Mast, a Darkness artifact which will create an uplink between the Veil and the Traveler and allow the Witness to create what it calls the "Final Shape". The Guardian enters the Typhon Imperator to attempt to destroy the Radial Mast before it can be activated, but Empress Caiatl, Calus' estranged daughter, brings her forces in so as to allow the Guardian to escape after their usage of Strand makes them exhausted. As the plan to destroy the Radial Mast in Calus' flagship suffered a setback, the Guardian then assists Rohan and Nimbus in reactivating the CloudArk in order to further protect the Veil, while eliminating local Vex forces that are siphoning power from the CloudArk.

Osiris and Rohan soon discover that the Shadow Legion are taking the Radial Mast directly to the vault containing the Veil. Feeling confident that the Guardian has mastered Strand, Osiris sends the Guardian to go after Calus' forces to the vault, where Rohan attempts to delay the Radial Mast from being activated. The Guardian is then unable to use Strand further after eliminating the Shadow Legion forces, leading Rohan to ultimately sacrifice himself to destroy the device. Soon after, the Witness demands Calus to go directly to the Veil to perform the uplink due to the Radial Mast's destruction. Osiris then guides the Guardian to further properly use Strand without leaving themselves vulnerable, believing it would be the edge they need to defeat Calus. After further honing their Strand powers, the Guardian makes their way to the vault containing the Veil, where Caiatl assists the Guardian by bringing her forces to the fight, but Calus breaches the vault and gains entry. The Guardian is able to use their Strand powers to defeat Calus, but the Guardian's Ghost becomes possessed again by the Witness; the Witness then uses Ghost to create the uplink. With the Veil's power, the Witness opens a portal that allows it to go inside the Traveler to an unknown location.

The Guardian afterwards returns to the Tower, where they speak to Zavala and Ikora, who lament the loss of the Traveler to the Witness and that the war is far from over, but also express gratitude in humanity's strengthened bonds with the Awoken, Eliksni, Cabal, and now the Cloud Striders and the Neomuni. They advise the Guardian to return to Neomuna to aid the Cloud Striders and to learn what they can about the Veil and their newfound Strand powers. Upon returning to Neomuna, the Guardian joins Nimbus for a memorial service for Rohan in the city's Hall of Heroes, but Nimbus leaves the service early due to their continued grief for Rohan. The Guardian speaks to Nimbus, where they state that the better way to memorialize Rohan would be to finish the mission that he started—finding and destroying the Vex in the Black Garden that were recreating the Black Heart (which was destroyed by the Guardian at the end of the original Destiny), which Nimbus reveals it to be an emulated version of the Veil. The Guardian assists Nimbus in collecting data packets from the Vex and deciphering Rohan's notes, which leads them to the Black Garden, where the Guardian and Nimbus find Rohan's missing exotic machine gun, the Deterministic Chaos. Using the late Cloud Strider's weapon, the Guardian takes down the Conceptual Mind, preventing the Vex from recreating the Black Heart, allowing Nimbus to finally grieve and honor Rohan and continue their mentor's legacy.

As the Guardian continues to work with Nimbus and Osiris, they begin to receive reports that the Neomuni are being haunted by nightmares from Nezarec, Final God of Pain, a former Disciple of the Witness who led the attack on Earth alongside Savathûn and the Witness during the Collapse, and believed to be dead; the Guardian is also able to hear Nezarec's whispers throughout their patrols on Neomuna. A fireteam of Guardians decide to help the Neomuni put an end to Nezarec's reign of terror by eliminating the former Disciple for good from his prison in the Witness's Pyramid mothership that was attacked and terraformed by the Traveler's beam of Light ("Root of Nightmares" raid). The Guardians travel to the Pyramid mothership near the Traveler in Earth's orbit, where they are contacted by Nezarec himself, revealed to have been unwittingly resurrected by the Traveler during its attack on the Black Fleet. The Guardians make their way through the terraformed Pyramid, where they face heavy resistance from the Shadow Legion and Tormentors in an effort to feed paracausal energy into a sarcophagus containing Nezarec to awaken him. After defeating a Shadow Legion lieutenant, Zo'aurc, Explicator of Planets, the Guardians fully awaken Nezarec and engage in one final showdown against the former Disciple. After a grueling battle, the Guardians defeat Nezarec once and for all, freeing Neomuna from his evil influence.

Season of Defiance 
Shortly after Emperor Calus's defeat and in the midst of the Guardian's continued efforts to assist the Cloud Striders and Neomuni in driving back the Shadow Legion and the Vex on Neptune, the Guardian receives a message from Mara Sov, who requests them to return to Earth to assist the Vanguard and their allies in the war effort against the Witness and its forces. The Guardian then meets with Mara, Devrim Kay, and Mithrax at the Farm in the EDZ (as previously featured in the original Destiny 2 "Red War" campaign), who advise them that the Shadow Legion has begun to capture civilians and imprison them in their Pyramid ships in the aftermath of the Witness's attack on the Traveler; the Tower shipwright Amanda Holliday, thought to have been killed by the Witness's attack on the Traveler, is one of those captives. The Guardian then heads to the EDZ with Crow where they find one of the Pyramids where Amanda and several captives are being held; they then use the Ascendant Scepter to enter the Ascendant Realm and fight their way through Shadow Legion and Taken forces to reach the interior of the Pyramid and rescue the civilians. After a short reunion between Crow and Amanda, the Guardian returns to the H.E.L.M. where they are greeted with another message from Mara, who urges the Guardian to continue using the Scepter to traverse the Ascendant Realm for the rescue operations. Mara then speaks to the Guardian personally at the Farm shortly after they rescue more civilians from the Shadow Legion, who knights the Guardian as part of her Queensguard.

Release
Lightfall was originally announced alongside Beyond Light and The Witch Queen in June 2020 and it was announced to be the third in this trilogy of expansions to cap off Destiny 2s first saga, with Lightfall originally planned for a late 2022 release—"Lightfall" was also a working title at this time. However, in February 2021, it was announced that due to the COVID-19 pandemic, as well as the crowded release window of the fall, The Witch Queen had been delayed to February 2022, thus pushing Lightfall back to early 2023, with another expansion, The Final Shape, announced for early 2024—the latter was added as Bungie felt that they needed one further expansion to wrap up the story of the first saga called the "Light and Darkness" saga.

Lightfall released on February 28, 2023, for PlayStation 4, PlayStation 5, Windows, Xbox One, and Xbox Series X/S platforms. It is available as paid downloadable content (DLC), and there are various versions of the expansion. The standard version includes access to Season 20 of the game. The "Lightfall + Annual Pass" bundle includes the expansion plus access to all Year 6 season passes (Season 20, 21, 22, and 23) and the two dungeons to be released in Seasons 21 and 23, respectively. All of the content can also be purchased separately. The "Lightfall + Annual Pass" bundle also includes access to the Quicksilver Storm Exotic Auto Rifle, its catalyst and an ornament, as well as an exotic sparrow—players who pre-ordered received early access to the weapon; pre-orders opened in Season 18. The weapon will become available to all players in Season 21. There is also a physical collector's edition which includes the "Lightfall + Annual Pass" bundle as well as a replica Pouka, an airborne fish-like creature native to Neomuna, among other items.

Reception

Critical reception to Lightfall was mixed.

References

Action role-playing video games
Bungie games
Destiny (video game series)
First-person shooters
Loot shooters
Multiplayer video games
PlayStation 4 games
PlayStation 4 Pro enhanced games
PlayStation 5 games
Post-apocalyptic video games
Role-playing video games
Science fiction video games
Stadia games
Video game expansion packs
Video games containing battle passes
Video games developed in the United States
Video games featuring protagonists of selectable gender
Video games using Havok
Windows games
Xbox One games
Xbox Series X and Series S games